Diesis (23 April 1980 – 18 November 2006) was a British Thoroughbred racehorse and sire. An outstanding two-year-old in 1982, he did not reach the same heights at three but went on to become an extremely successful breeding stallion in the United States.

Background
Diesis was a chestnut horse with a white star and three white socks bred in England by his owner 9th Baron Howard de Walden. He was sired by Sharpen Up out of the noted broodmare Doubly Sure, making him a full brother to the champion miler Kris and Keen, and a half-brother to several other good winners including Presidium and Rudimentary (Sandown Mile). The colt was named after the printer's symbol "‡" also known as a "double dagger". He was trained by Henry Cecil at his Warren Place stable in Newmarket, Suffolk.

Racing career
As a juvenile, Diesis won three races from four starts. After running fifth in a maiden race on his debut he won the Rhys-Jenkins and Standing Stakes by seven lengths. He was then moved up in class and won the Group One Middle Park Stakes over six furlongs at Newmarket Racecourse in October. Later that month he returned to Newmarket for the Dewhurst Stakes over seven furlongs, in which he was matched against Gorytus an unbeaten colt from the Dick Hern stable with an exceptional reputation. Gorytus ran very poorly (he was widely believed to have been drugged) and Diesis won his second Group One race very easily. He was the highest rated European two-year-old in the 1982 International Classification, a collaboration between the official handicappers of Britain, France and Ireland. Diesis was also rated the best two-year-old of the season by the independent Timeform organisation.

The spring of 1983 was unusually cold and wet, and Henry Cecil, along with many other trainers, had difficulty bringing his horses to peak fitness. His problems were compounded when Diesis suffered from lameness in early April and then injured a leg shortly before his seasonal debut in the 2000 Guineas. On 30 April Diesis started 100/30 favourite for the Guineas, but finished eighth of the sixteen runners behind Lomond. On his only other race, Diesis was beaten by The Noble Player in a seven furlong race at Kempton Park in May.

Stud record
Although standing as a stallion in Kentucky, Diesis' most successful progeny ran in Europe, including Epsom Oaks and Irish Oaks winners Diminuendo, Love Divine and Ramruma, Eclipse Stakes winner Elmaamul, multiple Group 1 winning, ten-furlong specialist Halling and Flemensfirth. Diesis' great-grandson Serpentine won the Epsom Derby in 2020.

He also sired North American Grade 1 winners Continuously, Husband, Rootentootenwooten, ex-English trained Storm Trooper and 2010 Arlington Million winner Debussy.

Diesis was euthanised on 18 November 2006 at Mill Ridge Farm, Lexington, Kentucky after fracturing a hip.

Pedigree

References

1980 racehorse births
2006 racehorse deaths
Racehorses trained in the United Kingdom
Racehorses bred in the United Kingdom
Thoroughbred family 2-o